A phase detector characteristic is a function of phase difference describing the output of the phase detector.

For the analysis of Phase detector it is usually considered the models
of PD in signal (time) domain and phase-frequency domain.
In this case for constructing of an adequate nonlinear mathematical model of PD in phase-frequency domain it is necessary to find the characteristic of phase detector.
The inputs of PD are high-frequency signals and the output contains a low-frequency error correction signal, corresponding to a phase difference of input signals. For the suppression of high-frequency component of the output of PD (if such component exists) a low-pass filter is applied. The
characteristic of PD is the dependence of the signal at the
output of PD (in the phase-frequency domain) on the difference of phases 
at the input of PD.

This characteristic of PD depends on the realization of PD and the types of waveforms of signals. Consideration of PD characteristic allows to apply averaging methods for high frequency oscillations and to pass from analysis and simulation of non autonomous models of phase synchronization systems in time domain to analysis and simulation of autonomous dynamical models in phase-frequency domain 
.

Analog multiplier phase detector characteristic 
Consider a classical phase detector implemented with analog multiplier and low-pass filter.

Here  and  denote high-frequency signals, piecewise differentiable functions ,  represent waveforms of input signals,  denote phases, and  denotes the output of the filter.
If  and  satisfy the high frequency conditions (see ) then phase detector characteristic  is calculated in such a way that time-domain model filter output 

and filter output for phase-frequency domain model 

are almost equal:

Sine waveforms case 
Consider a simple case of harmonic waveforms   and integration filter.

Standard engineering assumption is that the filter removes
the upper sideband  from
the input but leaves the lower sideband 
without change.

Consequently, the PD characteristic in the case of sinusoidal waveforms is

Square waveforms case 

For this signals it was found that similar thing takes place.
The characteristic for the case of square waveforms is

General waveforms case 

Consider general case of piecewise-differentiable waveforms , .

This class of functions can be expanded in Fourier series.
Denote by

Then the phase detector characteristic is

Modeling method based on this result is described in

Examples

References 

Detectors
Electronic circuits